The Canadian Champion Male Sprint Horse is a  Canadian Thoroughbred horse racing honor that is part of the Sovereign Awards program awarded annually to the top Thoroughbred Male competing in sprint races in Canada. Created in 1980 by the Jockey Club of Canada as a single award for Canadian Champion Sprint Horse, in 2009 it was split so that it became a separate award for the male sprinter and for the Canadian Champion Female Sprint Horse.

Winners

2009: Field Commission
2010: Hollywood Hit
2011: Essence Hit Man
2012: Essence Hit Man
2013: Phil's Dream
2014: Calgary Cat
2015: Stacked Deck
2016: Noholdingback Bear
2017: Pink Lloyd
2018: Pink Lloyd
2019: Pink Lloyd
2020: Pink Lloyd

References

Horse racing awards
Horse racing in Canada
Sovereign Award winners